Tomáš Šmíd (born 20 May 1956) is a former tennis player from Czechoslovakia, who won nine singles titles during his career. In doubles, he won 54 titles and was world No. 1 in doubles from December 17, 1984 to August 11, 1985. The right-hander reached his highest ATP singles ranking of world No. 11 in July 1984. Šmíd participated in 31 Davis Cup ties for Czechoslovakia from 1977–1989, posting a 20-10 record in doubles and a 22-15 record in singles. Šmíd was a part of the winning 1980 Davis Cup team, a team which included Ivan Lendl. In the final against Italy, Šmíd won a singles rubber against Adriano Panatta after being two sets down, and won the doubles rubber when partnered with Lendl as they beat Panatta and Paolo Bertolucci to clinch the 1980 Davis Cup for Czechoslovakia.

Šmíd coached Boris Becker for 14 months, from April 1991 until June 1992, during which time Becker reached the 1991 Wimbledon final and regained the world number 1 ranking for nine weeks. Becker lost the number 1 ranking after a third round loss at the 1991 US Open to Paul Haarhuis. In terms of Becker winning a tournament during the time when Šmíd was his coach, the high point was when Becker came back from two sets down to defeat world number 1, Jim Courier, in the final of the Brussels tournament in February 1992. Becker defeated Courier by the score of 6–7(5–7), 2–6, 7–6(12–10), 7–6(7–5), 7–5. Becker ended the coaching arrangement with Šmíd in June 1992.

Career finals

Singles: 28 (9 wins, 19 losses)

Doubles: 101 (54 wins, 47 losses)

Grand Slam finals

Doubles: 3 (2 wins, 1 loss)

External links
 
 
 

1956 births
Living people
Czech male tennis players
Czechoslovak male tennis players
French Open champions
Sportspeople from Plzeň
US Open (tennis) champions
Grand Slam (tennis) champions in men's doubles
Universiade medalists in tennis
Universiade gold medalists for Czechoslovakia
Medalists at the 1977 Summer Universiade
ATP number 1 ranked doubles tennis players